Charles Tucker (20 February 1857 – 5 December 1928) was Mayor of Adelaide from 1894 to 1898 and a member of the South Australian House of Assembly for the seats of Encounter Bay and Alexandra.

Born at Walkerville, South Australia, Tucker was a mayor of Port Adelaide.

He was associated with the shipping agents Graves & Co. and Malpas & Co. as well as a variety of mining firms such asF. Ayers, Blades, Gall, Scandinavian mine at Purnamoota, Euriowie, Teetulpa, Newcastle mine, Thackaringa Copper mine and Balhannah goldmining company. He was the wwner of Trinity Moonta Mine.

Tucker was a member of the Assembly for Encounter Bay (29 April 1899 to 6 July 1899 and 29 July 1899 to 2 May 1902) and Alexandra (3 May 1902 to 2 November 1906).

"On 12 February 1907, as customs agent for John Martin & Co. Ltd, Tucker was found guilty of having defrauded the Customs Department during the 1890s of duties payable on goods imported by the firm. His brother and nephew were also implicated. The amount involved approached £33,000 of which Tucker's share had been about £2,000 a year for more than a decade. Tucker was sentenced to two years imprisonment with hard labour; the Observer cautioned against 'the pretensions of smooth-tongued and clever individuals of gentlemanly address and suitably captivating manners'. It had been South Australia's longest criminal trial: there were 97 witnesses and some 8,000 exhibits, and the case ran for 31 days."

More sensational details of his private life were published by the Kalgoorlie Sun.

References

catalog search "Charles Tucker", State Library of South Australia
catalog search "Charles Tucker 1857 1928", State Library of South Australia

Mayors and Lord Mayors of Adelaide
People educated at Adelaide Educational Institution
1928 deaths
1857 births
Australian fraudsters
Members of the South Australian House of Assembly